The Coal Creek Bridge was located southeast of Carlisle, Iowa, United States. The  span carried traffic on Fillmore Street over Coal Creek. The Warren County Board of Supervisors contracted with the Seevers Manufacturing Company of Oskaloosa, Iowa to build this bridge. The Pratt pony truss was completed in 1889. It was the only example of this type of bridge built by the company left in Iowa. It was listed on the National Register of Historic Places in 1998, The bridge was taken down in 2008.

References

External links

Bridges completed in 1889
Buildings and structures in Warren County, Iowa
Truss bridges in Iowa
Road bridges on the National Register of Historic Places in Iowa
National Register of Historic Places in Warren County, Iowa
Pratt truss bridges in the United States